Maureen Gallace (born 1960) is an American painter based in New York City. She has exhibited extensively internationally, including solo exhibitions at MoMA PS1, La Conservera, Spain, the Art Institute of Chicago, and Dallas Museum of Art. Gallace's work was included in the 2010 Whitney Biennial.

Early life and education
Gallace was born in Stamford, Connecticut in 1960. She received her BFA from The Hartford Art School, University of Hartford in 1981 and her MFA from Rutgers University in 1983.

Career
Gallace paints intimately sized landscapes of houses and beaches devoid of people. She has been inspired by the rural New England landscape. Her process involves careful observation, omission, attention to brushstroke, color, and composition. Gallace describes the process of arriving at her streamlined representations as staring at something and breaking it down to what she finds most important. In a review of her show at 303 Gallery in New York in 2015, Peter Schjeldahl surmised that her aim is "description, not of how things look but of how they seem."

In Gallace's oil painting Cape Cod, Early September (2008) there is a simplified white cottage in the center surrounded by a pale blue sky and bright greenery. This painting was a part of the 2010 Whitney Biennial. She creates paintings with visible brushstrokes by painting wet on wet layers of oil on panel. Her technique flattens the perspective in the picture. She excludes details on the cottage, which allows viewers to make their own associations with the image. Gallace's work relates to early American Modernist painting, especially Edward Hopper's representations of small towns and Milton Avery's abstracted seascapes. Schjeldahl also suggests it has kinship with the still lifes of the mid-20th-century Italian painter Giorgio Morandi.

Bruce Hainley selected Beach No. 2 (2013) as the "Best of 2013" in the December 2013 issue of Artforum. He wrote: 
Gallace ... makes some of the most intense paintings going. Luminous grays, glissandos of white, and auroral pinks and oranges dramatize her precise blues. In her “seascapes,” ... waves crash upon the shore and the horizons disappear—which is not a minor event for a painter who always considers grounding. While the artist’s photographs (one was reproduced as the show’s announcement card) document specific locales and buildings, some already dismantled by environmental or economic havoc, the paintings transmigrate soulfulness more than they do any topography. Gallace dissolves ongoing nattering about abstraction and representation, achieving the rare, staunch beauty of the quietly hard-won.

Exhibitions
 2017: MoMA PS1, Queens, NY
 2013: Overduin and Kite, Los Angeles
 2011: La Conservera, Ceuti, Murcia, Spain
 2009: Michael Kohn Gallery, Los Angeles, CA
 2007: Monika Sprüth Philomene Magers, Munich, Germany
 2007: Paradise Project, Douglas Hyde Gallery, Dublin, Ireland
 2006: The Art Institute of Chicago Museum, Curated by James Rondeau, Chicago, IL
 2006: 303 Gallery, New York, NY
 2005: Kerlin Gallery, Dublin, Ireland
 2004: Douglas Hyde Gallery, Trinity College, Dublin, Ireland
 2003: Dallas Museum of Art, Curated by Suzanne Weaver, Dallas, TX
 2003: Maureen Paley Interim Art, London, Great Britain
 2002: Gallery Side2, Tokyo, Japan
 2001: Galleria Il Capricorno, Venice, Italy
 2001: Kerlin Gallery, Dublin, Ireland
 2001: Fukui City Art Museum, Fukui-shi, Japan
 1999: Texas Gallery, Houston, TX
 1997: Johnen & Schottle, Cologne, Germany
 1996: Museum Schloss-Hardenberg, Velbert, Germany. Catalog
 1996: Galerie Christian Drantmann, Brussels, Belgium
 1996: Modulo Gallery, Lisbon, Portugal
 1995: Kohn Turner Gallery, Los Angeles, CA
 1994: Jack Hanley Gallery, San Francisco, CA
 1993: Nicole Klagsbrun Gallery, New York, NY
 1993: Nielsen Gallery, Boston, MA
 1990: Julian Pretto Gallery, New York, NY

External links
 Official website

References

Living people
1960 births
American women painters
Landscape painters
20th-century American painters
20th-century American women artists
21st-century American women artists